Hellen Syombua (born 8 August 1997) is a Kenyan athlete. She competed in the women's 400 metres event at the 2019 World Athletics Championships. She did not advance to compete in the semi-finals.

In June 2021, she qualified to represent Kenya at the 2020 Summer Olympics.

References

External links
 

1997 births
Living people
Kenyan female sprinters
Place of birth missing (living people)
World Athletics Championships athletes for Kenya
African Games medalists in athletics (track and field)
African Games bronze medalists for Kenya
Athletes (track and field) at the 2015 African Games
Athletes (track and field) at the 2020 Summer Olympics
Olympic athletes of Kenya
Olympic female sprinters
20th-century Kenyan women
21st-century Kenyan women